The 2015 FIBA Europe Under-18 Championship Division B was an international youth basketball competition held in Austria in 2015.

Participating teams

  (15th place, 2014 FIBA Europe Under-18 Championship Division A)

  (14th place, 2014 FIBA Europe Under-18 Championship Division A)

  (16th place, 2014 FIBA Europe Under-18 Championship Division A)

First round
In this round, the 24 teams are allocated in four groups of six teams each. The best two teams of each group advance to the Quarterfinal groups.

Group A

Group B

Group C

Group D

Second round

17th–24th place groups

Group I

Group J

9th–16th place groups

Group G

Group H

Quarterfinal groups

Group E

Group F

Playoff round

21st–24th place playoffs

17th–20th place playoffs

13th–16th place playoffs

9th–12th place playoffs

5th–8th place playoffs

1st–4th place playoffs

Final standings

References

External links
FIBA official website

FIBA U18 European Championship Division B
2015–16 in European basketball
2015–16 in Austrian basketball
International youth basketball competitions hosted by Austria
July 2015 sports events in Europe
August 2015 sports events in Europe